John Creswey, was a mercenary captain during the Hundred Years War and was an Englishman.

At the end of hostilities during the Hundred Years War Creswey and his men found themselves unemployed and so become one of the 30 so-called Tard-Venus bands of bandits, that ranged the French country side pillaging towns. Leading to Avignon, Pope Innocent VI preaching a crusade against the robbers.

His story is mentioned in the Chronicles of Froissart

After pillaging the counties of Macon, Lyon and Forez through the season of Lent, mid, year Creswey joined Naudon de Bageran, Francois Hennequin, Espiote, Robert Briquet, and Camus bour, and marched on the wealthy and largely undefended papal city of Avignon to make ransom of the Pope and cardinals.

But on 3 June 1362, this army was cut to pieces by 400 Spaniard and Castilians soldiers under the orders of Henry of Trastamara (King of Castile and León) at Montpensier.

References

Hundred Years' War
People of the Hundred Years' War
Medieval mercenaries
14th century in France
Year of birth unknown